Qulliq Energy Corporation (QEC; ; Inuinnaqtun: Qulliq Alruyaktuqtunik Ikumadjutiit) is a Canadian territorial corporation which is the sole electricity utility and distributor in Nunavut. It is wholly owned by the Government of Nunavut. Its name is derived from the qulliq, a traditional oil lamp used by Inuit and other Arctic indigenous peoples. It is headquartered in Baker Lake, Nunavut.

History
Qulliq Energy was established by the Nunavut Power Utilities Act (now the Qulliq Energy Corporation Act) in 2001, two years after the 1999 creation of Canada's territory of Nunavut, to take over the assets of the Northwest Territories Power Corporation (which was itself a successor to the Northern Canada Power Commission). Its original name was Nunavut Power Corporation and it was renamed Qulliq Energy Corporation in 2003 and the mandate of the corporation expanded to include energy conservation and alternative generation development.

Qulliq Energy established Nunavut Energy Centre in 2006 as a division focusing on energy conservation through public outreach. The centre was closed down on March 31, 2009, and its functions were transferred to the territorial government departments.

Operations
Low population, severe weather and remoteness of transportation and construction technology make long distance high voltage grids unviable. Every community in Nunavut relies on independent diesel generators, fueled by the annual sealift re-supply during the summer shipping season. This dependence on diesel presents its own set of environmental and economic impacts, leaving the territory vulnerable to world energy price fluctuations. The first new power generation facility since the establishment of the company was the expansion of the Iqaluit power plant.

The geography of Nunavut presents unique challenges to hydro-electric facilities, but the company is actively engaged in site reviews for hydro-electric developments in the 12-20 MW range around Iqaluit, the territorial capital. The hydro-electric plants are planned in Jaynes Inlet and Armshow South on the south shore of Frobisher Bay.

During the 1970s, there had been suggestions of NCPC employing "slowpoke" nuclear generators to produce power in the many isolated communities.

Since the establishment, periodic discussions continue regarding the possibility of combining Nunavut's fuel delivery functions under Qulliq Energy.

Iqaluit Hydroelectric Project
In 2005, Quilliq Energy initiated a study of potential sites near Iqaluit for the development of a hydroelectric power station. Two sites, Jaynes Inlet and Armshow South, were selected as the most cost-effective and viable solutions after comprehensive research. The Jaynes Inlet site would be the site of a 12.5 MW hydroelectric dam that is expected to meet Iqaluit's current energy demand. The Armshow South site would be the site of a 7.3 MW hydroelectric dam that would be developed when additional capacity is needed.

However, Quilliq Energy does not have an adequate revenue surplus or borrowing ability in order to fund the project on its own, especially as 13 of the existing 25 diesel-fired power stations across the territory are in need of replacement. As a result, the hydroelectric project was shelved indefinitely in 2014.

Other Renewable Energy Projects

In numerous communities across the Canadian north, renewable energy projects using solar panels, wind turbines, and hydroelectric power plants are being pursued.
The option of extending a transmission line to Manitoba would enable hydroelectricity from Manitoba Hydro to be used in the Kivalliq region of Nunavut.
Photovoltaic solar power is particularly attractive due to its absence of structural-mechanical complexity.  Given the very long days of summer, in some communities the installation of such panels can enable diesel gensets to be turned off for multiple hours at a time.  Additionally, Nunavut is also pursuing independent power production in the form of solar panels on schools, healthcare facilities, and municipal buildings.

Controversies
In 2010 and 2011, five lawsuits were filed against Qulliq Energy by former employees for wrongful/constructive dismissal, while some other former workers accused the company for the violation of Inuit rights in the workplace.

See also
 List of Canadian electric utilities
 List of generating stations in Nunavut

References

External links
 Qulliq Energy Corporation
 Ikuma I, 2001 Report
 Ikuma 2, 2002 Report

Electric power companies of Canada
Crown corporations of Nunavut
Energy companies established in 2001
Kivalliq Region
2001 establishments in Nunavut